Loxostegopsis curialis is a moth in the family Crambidae. It was described by William Barnes and James Halliday McDunnough in 1918. It is found in North America, where it has been recorded from California, New Mexico, Texas and Utah.

References

Moths described in 1918
Spilomelinae